The Asia Cup Moot, or Asia Cup in short, is an annual international moot court competition that is open to law schools in Asia. The competition inaugurated in 1999 and is held in Tokyo, Japan. It is jointly organised by the Ministry of Foreign Affairs of Japan and the International Law Students Exchange Council, and the moot problem typically contains issues pertaining to public international law, international humanitarian law, and international human rights. The top 10–12 scoring teams for the memorials qualify for the international rounds in Tokyo, but generally each country except Japan is only permitted to send one team. Each team may feature up to four oralists. As of 2021, 56 different law schools have competed in Tokyo since the moot's inception.

For some schools, the moot (as is the Red Cross International Humanitarian Law Moot) is seen as a rite of passage for Asian mooters before they go on to participate in the larger international moots, such as the Jessup Moot and Vis Moot. National University of Singapore is the most successful schools winning six championships. The Philippines and Singapore, with ten wins apiece, are the winningest countries. Due to COVID-19, the 2020 edition of the moot was cancelled, and the 2021 and 2022 editions held online.

Competition records

References

External links
 http://2015ilsec.wix.com/ilsec#!asia-cup/c24jd
 https://web.archive.org/web/20100115223155/http://kokusaiho.aquasky.jp/en/records/index.htm

Moot court competitions
International law